Bernadette Beck (born 1994) is an English actress, entrepreneur, philanthropist, and stunt woman. She was born in Islington, London, England. She is best known for her role as Peaches 'N Cream on The CW series Riverdale. Beck also appeared on the CW series The Tomorrow People.

References

External links 
https://m.imdb.com/name/nm4386140

1994 births
Living people
21st-century English actresses
21st-century English businesspeople
Businesspeople from London
English stunt performers
English women philanthropists
English television actresses
Actresses from London
People from Islington (district)